The Hireling is a 1957 novel by the British writer L.P. Hartley. A widowed aristocrat bonds with the ex-soldier who drives his own car in a chauffeur service.

Adaptation
In 1973 the novel was adapted into a British film of the same title directed by Alan Bridges and starring Robert Shaw and Sarah Miles.

References

Bibliography
 Goble, Alan. The Complete Index to Literary Sources in Film. Walter de Gruyter, 1999.
  Wright, Adrian. Foreign Country: The Life of L.P. Hartley. I. B. Tauris, 2001.

1957 British novels
Novels by L. P. Hartley
Novels set in England
Hamish Hamilton books
British novels adapted into films